Nimburg may refer to:

 a place relating to Teningen
 Nimburg, the German name of Nymburk, a city in the Czech Republic
 Nimburg, Nebraska, a community in the United States